The Nokia Lumia 928 is a high-end smartphone developed by Nokia that runs Microsoft's Windows Phone 8 operating system. It was announced on May 10, 2013, as a Verizon-exclusive variant of the Nokia Lumia 920. It became available on May 16, 2013, on a two-year contract for $99.99 in the United States. It is exclusive to the U.S. and Canadian markets.

Key features

The main features of the Nokia Lumia include: 
  1280 x 768 AMOLED 334 PPI touchscreen display
 8.7 MP PureView camera with Carl Zeiss optics and Xenon Flash
 Optical Image Stabilization
 1080p HD video and photo recording

Availability 
The phone was released for sale exclusively through Verizon in the United States for $99 with a 2-year contract or $500 with no contract. Currently, the phone is available for free with a 2-year contract. In other countries, the aluminum-made Nokia Lumia 925 is offered instead of 928, although the 925 is also available on T-Mobile US.

Reception 
Armando Rodriguez from PC World wrote: "The Nokia Lumia 928 is excellent for capturing images in low-light environments, but the phone falls victim to Windows Phone's various shortcomings."

Alex Colon from PCMag wrote: "For $100, the Nokia Lumia 928 is a lot of phone, both literal and figurative. I do wish it were smaller still, like the just-announced Lumia 925, but you're getting plenty of bang for your buck here. The biggest question is how much you care about apps. The Lumia 928 is competitive in many ways with some of the best smartphones available, but it just can't keep up when it comes to apps."

See also 

Microsoft Lumia

References

External links

Microsoft Lumia
Nokia smartphones
Mobile phones introduced in 2013
Discontinued smartphones
Windows Phone devices
PureView